Zdarsky is a surname. Notable people with the name include:
Chip Zdarsky (born 1975), Canadian comics creator
Mathias Zdarsky (1856–1940), Austrian skier
Robert Z'Dar (born Robert J. Zdarsky; 1950–2015), American actor and filmmaker 
Dorothy H. Rose (born Dorothy Zdarsky; 1920–2005), American politician from New York

See also
Mount Zdarsky, a mountain in Antarctica
Starsky (disambiguation)